Amy A. Perruso (born November 5, 1968) is an American politician and educator serving as a member of the Hawaii House of Representatives for the 46th district. She represents the 46th House District as a member of the Democratic Party.

Early life and education
Perruso was born and raised in Fallbrook, California. She earned a Bachelor of Arts degree in political science from the University of Southern California in 1990 and studied at the University of Helsinki as a Fulbright Scholar. She took courses toward a doctorate at the University of California, Los Angeles and earned her teaching credential from the University of Hawaiʻi at Mānoa. She earned a PhD in political science and government from the University of Hawaiʻi at Mānoa.

Career
As a result of the education workers' strike, Perruso was one of several teachers to seek election to the Hawaii State Legislature. Perruso, a former secretary-treasurer of the Hawaii State Teachers Association who taught social studies at Mililani High School, defeated the incumbent Democratic representative in the primaries. Perruso then went on to collect twice as many votes as her Republican opponent, John E. Miller, in the race for the 46th District.

In March 2020, Perruso joined Tina Wildberger and Russell Ruderman in donating $4,000 from their raises as state legislators to help pay for school lunches in their district. In 2021, she became an inaugural member of the newly-formed Progressive Legislative Caucus of the House of Representatives, a coalition of 18 left-wing members of the body.

In 2018 her candidacy was endorsed by the Democratic Socialists of America.

Personal life
She is married to John Mackey.

See also
List of Democratic Socialists of America who have held office in the United States

References

1968 births
Living people
21st-century American politicians
21st-century American women politicians
Democratic Party members of the Hawaii House of Representatives
National Education Association people
Women state legislators in Hawaii